The Bombay Company Ltd. was established in 1886. It is one of the oldest companies in India. The company was revived in 1986 by setting up two divisions: precision springs Division and Balance Division.

The Precision Spring division of the company was set up in 1987 in technical collaboration with NHK Spring Co. Ltd., Japan, to manufacture Cold Coiled precision springs. It commenced commercial production in 1987. The company established itself as one of the leading manufacturer of precision Springs in India under the leadership of Mr.N.Vijayaraghavan.

In 1992, the business merged into The Bombay Burmah Trading Corporation Ltd. Also, during this period, the company expanded its installed capacity from 1000 metric tons to 1500 metric tons to cater to the growing demands of automotive components market.

References

External links

Manufacturing companies based in Mumbai
Manufacturing companies established in 1987
1987 establishments in Maharashtra
Indian companies established in 1886
Indian companies established in 1987